Thomas Fletcher was an 18th-century Anglican bishop in Ireland.

Before his appointment as Bishop of Dromore in 1744 Fletcher had previously been Dean of Down. When translated to  Killdare the following year he also became Dean of Christ Church Cathedral, Dublin as the two posts were held in commendam.  A Fellow of All Souls College, Oxford, he died on 18 March 1761.

References

1761 deaths
Fellows of All Souls College, Oxford
Deans of Down
Deans of Christ Church Cathedral, Dublin
Anglican bishops of Dromore
Anglican bishops of Kildare
Year of birth unknown
18th-century Anglican bishops in Ireland